Jason Kenneth George Fowler (born 20 August 1974) is an English former professional footballer. During his career, he made over 250 appearances in the Football League in spells with Bristol City, Cardiff City and Torquay United.

Career

Having featured for both Southampton and Oxford United as a schoolboy, Fowler signed for his hometown club Bristol City at the age of 16, making his debut during a 2–1 defeat to Reggiana in the Anglo-Italian Cup on 8 December 1992. However, he struggled to establish himself in the first team and was eventually released in 1996.

He was signed by Cardiff City and quickly became a regular in the squad, helping the side to promotion from Division Three in the 1998–99 season. He was diagnosed with an over-active thyroid during the 2000–01 season and struggled to keep his place in the squad due to the illness. He left Cardiff in 2001 for a fresh start at Torquay United where he spent four years before being forced into retirement in 2005 due to the discovery of Arthritis in his hips.

Post-retirement

In September 2006, Fowler began working as an assistant coach with the Cardiff City F.C. Academy under 16's team, along with James McCarthy.

Honours
Individual
PFA Team of the Year: 1998–99 Third Division

References

External links

1974 births
Living people
English footballers
Association football midfielders
Footballers from Bristol
Bristol City F.C. players
Cardiff City F.C. players
Torquay United F.C. players
English Football League players